The Tengjhih National Forest Recreation Area is located in Baoshan Village, Taoyuan District, Kaohsiung, Taiwan.

Administration
The forest recreation area is administered by the 70th, 71st and 72nd offices of the Forestry Bureau.

Geography
The forest spreads over an area of 770 hectares with height ranges from 500 to 1,804 meters. It has a mean temperature of 18-21ºC. The forest consists of Chinese firs, maples, cherry trees, plum trees etc.

Facilities
The forest is equipped with log cabins, watchtower, meteorology station and alarm. Various activities can also be done in the forest, such as jungle trekking, hiking, mount climbing, bird watching etc.

References

External links

  

Geography of Kaohsiung
National forest recreation areas in Taiwan
Tourist attractions in Kaohsiung